Örby slott is a residential area in the suburb of Söderort in Stockholm Municipality, Sweden.

Örby took its name from  Örby Manor (Örby slott) which is situated in the area and which also has given name to the neighbouring residential area of Örby. The modern area was created in 1956. Örby  manor was built by nobleman and official Henrik Falkenberg (1634-1691) Falkenberg was governor of Älvsborg county, The former manor is now  used by the Embassy of Vietnam.

References

Districts of Stockholm